Lee Yi-chieh (born 1992) is a Taiwanese actress.

She won a best newcomer award at the 2011 Chinese Film Media Awards for her work in that film. Lee's character in Wild Sparrow (2019) was a young woman living in Zhongli District, struggling with romantic relationships and maintaining employment while raising her son. It was the first time that the award was given to two recipients.

References

External links

1992 births
Living people
Taiwanese film actresses
21st-century Taiwanese actresses